Sir Thomas Thornhill, 1st Baronet (26 March 1837 –  2 April 1900) was a British Conservative Party politician.

He was appointed High Sheriff of Suffolk in 1860. He was elected to the House of Commons as one of the two members of parliament (MPs) for the Western division of Suffolk at a by-election in October 1875, and held the seat until the constituency was abolished at the 1885 general election.

He was made a baronet, of Riddlesworth Hall in the Parish of Riddlesworth in the County of Norfolk and of Pakenham Lodge in the Parish of Pakenham, Suffolk, on 11 August 1885.

Family
Thornhill married Katherine Edith Isabella Hodgson, daughter of Richard Hodgson-Huntley, of Carham Hall, Northumberland, by his wife Catherine Moneypenny Compton, daughter of Anthony Compton, of Carham Hall.
Lady Thornhill was in January 1902 granted permission to take the surname and arms of Compton combined with Thornhill, for herself and her issue.
He was succeeded by their son Anthony John Compton-Thornhill.

References

External links 
 

1837 births
1900 deaths
High Sheriffs of Suffolk
Conservative Party (UK) MPs for English constituencies
UK MPs 1874–1880
UK MPs 1880–1885
Baronets in the Baronetage of the United Kingdom
People from Breckland District